was a Japanese actor. He was born in Yokohama, Kanagawa, Japan. In 1951, he signed with Daiei film company. nad made his film debut with Kamikaze Tokkotai. He was most famous for playing villains. He died of a myocardial infarction in Chōfu, Tokyo at age 74.

Selected filmography

Films
Danger Stalks Near (1957) – Akama
The Human Condition (1959) – Gao
The Bad Sleep Well (1960) – Horiuchi
Zero Focus (1961) – Kenichi Uhara
Love Under the Crucifix (1962) - 
Abashiri Prison (1965) – Gonda
Branded to Kill (1967) – the Number One Killer
Eleven Samurai (1967) – Chief Retainer Tatewaki
Samurai Banners (1969) – Aoki
Zatoichi and the One-Armed Swordsman (1971) – Kakuzen 
Kantō Exile (1971)
Wandering Ginza Butterfly (1972) – Ōwada
Za Gokiburi - Shimura
Female Convict Scorpion: Beast Stable 
Lady Snowblood 2: Love Song of Vengeance (1974)
The Resurrection of the Golden Wolf (1979) – Isokawa
A Taxing Woman's Return (1988) – Yoneda
Sakura no Sono (1990) – Nakamura

Television
Katsu Kaishū (TV series) (1974)(Taiga Drama)
G-Men '75 (1977) – Guest, Kimishima
Daitsuiseki (1978) – Guest’ Genda, Okazaki

Dubbing
Escape from Zahrain – Sharif (Yul Brynner)
Judd, for the Defense – Clinton Judd (Carl Betz)
Sherlock Holmes (1984) – Professor Moriarty (Eric Porter)
Star Wars Episode IV: A New Hope (Movie theater edition) – Darth Vader
Star Wars Episode V: The Empire Strikes Back (Movie theater edition) – Darth Vader

References

External links
 
 
 

1927 births
2001 deaths
People from Yokohama
Japanese male film actors